The 1972–73 season was the 35th season of competitive association football in the Football League played by Chester, an English club based in Chester, Cheshire.

Also, it was the 15th season spent in the Fourth Division after its creation. Alongside competing in the Football League the club also participated in the FA Cup, Football League Cup and the Welsh Cup.

Football League

Results summary

Results by matchday

Matches

FA Cup

League Cup

Welsh Cup

Season statistics

References

1972-73
English football clubs 1972–73 season